Mount Fitch is the third-highest peak in the Commonwealth of Massachusetts at . It is located on the ridge between Mount Greylock at 3,491 feet (1,064 m) to its south and Mount Williams at 2,956 feet (901 m) to its north. The peak sits in the northwest corner of the Town of Adams (originally known as the Town of East Hoosac) in Berkshire County.  The forested summit is approximately  due west of a local high-point on the Appalachian Trail. Mount Fitch does not meet the Appalachian Mountain Club's prominence criterion of 200 vertical feet of separation from adjacent peaks as outlined in New England's Four-thousand footers list. Currently there is no side-spur trail or signage directing a hiker to the summit of Mt. Fitch from the Appalachian Trail; however, there is a wooden placard at the summit itself (pictured at right). The top is infrequently visited by hikers due to its anonymity, the bushwhack necessary to reach the top and the viewless summit.

The peak is named for Ebenezer Fitch, who served as president of Williams College in nearby Williamstown, Massachusetts from 1793-1815. The name and geographic significance of the peak were disparaged by R.R.R. Brooks in his 1953 history of Williamstown, "[I]t is doubtful whether more than one resident in ten knows Mt. Williams from Mt. Fitch".

In 1947, local residents Dr. Joseph Wilk and Bartlett Hendricks terminated clear cutting the summit of Mount Fitch, which remains overgrown to this date.

Geography, Geology & Ecology 
see Mount Greylock

References

External links 

http://www.peakbagger.com/peak.aspx?pid=7062 Peakbagger Website.
 https://www.youtube.com/watch?v=SQJfkGdcki8 Brief summary of locating and placing the sign.

Taconic Mountains
Mountains of Berkshire County, Massachusetts
Mountains on the Appalachian Trail